José Antonio Díaz (born February 19, 1963), also known as Joey "CoCo" Diaz, is a Cuban-American stand-up comedian, actor, and podcaster. After pursuing stand-up comedy full time in 1991 in the Colorado and Seattle areas, Diaz relocated to Los Angeles in 1995 where he began acting, securing various film and television roles, including My Name Is Earl, The Longest Yard, Spider-Man 2, Grudge Match, and The Many Saints of Newark.

In 2010, Diaz started to gain widespread notoriety from his appearances on The Joe Rogan Experience podcast. From 2012 to 2020, he was the host of his own podcast, The Church of What's Happening Now with Lee Syatt, and has since hosted Uncle Joey's Joint.

Early life
José Antonio Diaz was born in Havana, Cuba. He immigrated at a young age to the United States, where he was raised in North Bergen, New Jersey, a town where he noted he was the only Cuban-American at the time. His mother ran a bar and a successful numbers game operation. He was raised Catholic as a youngster and enjoyed learning stories about Francis of Assisi and St. Michael. Diaz attended McKinley School and then North Bergen High School, where he won awards for performing arts. He graduated in 1982.

Diaz's father died when he was three years old. His mother died when he was 16, Diaz having found her dead in their home. He was taken in by four families around North Bergen during his teenage years, and credits about twenty people who helped him, but his reckless nature and tendency to get into trouble caused him to move from one home to another. During this time, Diaz began taking drugs and committing crimes. Diaz explains that his peers' sense of humor greatly influenced his comedy career, as did the comedy albums of Richard Pryor.

In 1982, Diaz moved to Colorado. However, his growing homesickness led to his return to New Jersey initially for his birthday in 1984, but he stayed there for eighteen months. He later called this time as "the worst 18 months of my life" and "the biggest mistake of my life," as his cocaine abuse worsened.

In June 1985, Diaz left New Jersey and returned to Colorado to study economics at the University of Colorado at Boulder. He did not enjoy his time there, and quit before taking up work selling roofing which earned him money, but he remained unhappy. 

Following his arrest for kidnapping and aggravated robbery, he was sent to prison in 1988, serving 16 months of a four-year sentence. During his time in prison, Diaz would perform stand-up routines for his fellow inmates during the weekly film screening event when the projector broke. It took Diaz a further three years to try stand-up, despite being often told of his talent, and later called his entry into the line of work as "the last resort" as he had many other jobs in the past.

Career

Stand-up comedy
After seeing the 1988 film  Punchline, Diaz responded to an advertisement in a Denver newspaper for a $37 stand-up comedy course, and developed a blue comedy act. Before he did his first standup routine, he worked as a doorman at Wit's End.

Diaz performed his first routine on June 18, 1991 at the Comedy Works in Denver at a show headlined by Matt Woods. In April 1992, prior to his opening spot for Troy Baxley in Boulder, Colorado, Diaz took cocaine before going on stage and had a set that he described as "a disaster". He then ceased to take the substance before a performance. After developing his act, Diaz entered the Beck's Amateur Comedy Competition and won. He initially lost another competition until the winner was caught stealing jokes made famous by Jerry Seinfeld and Diaz was declared the winner. Diaz claimed Comedy Works manager Wende Curtis promised him a flight to Los Angeles for a showcase spot at The Comedy Store for owner Mitzi Shore, but never received either. Diaz went on to participate in a similar contest in Seattle, Washington, and finished sixth out of 40. In 1994, Diaz returned to the Comedy Works and found Curtis had started a developmental program for comics which he joined. The process involved group writing sessions at Wood's home followed by sets in the club the same evening. At one point, Curtis banned Diaz from the Comedy Works before it was lifted after they met years later.

In 1995, Diaz left Colorado for Los Angeles, California to try and make it as a successful stand-up comic. He used his divorce from his first wife, and the loss of contact with their daughter in the process, as a motivation so he "could come back and make her proud". 

On November 4, 2007, Diaz appeared in North Bergen to help raise money for North Bergen High School's basketball team uniforms.

In April 2012, Diaz supported his Where I Got My Balls From documentary with the release of his stand-up special, It's Either You or the Priest. It went to number one on the Billboard comedy charts in the UK and Canada, and number one on iTunes.

In December 2016, Diaz put out his first one-hour comedy special, Sociably Unacceptable, through the on-demand subscription services Seeso and Comedy Dynamics.

Film and television
In 1998, Diaz received a contract to star in a television pilot, playing a bartender in a series titled Bronx County, after a talent scout at CBS saw him perform comedy in Seattle. The offer was a total surprise to Diaz, who initially did not believe him until he saw the talent scout possess tickets to have him fly to Los Angeles for the shoot. The series was not picked up, but the opportunity led to more work for Diaz, including an offer in his first feature film, a referee in BASEketball (1998), and a part in the television series NYPD Blue. In 2000, Diaz was featured in You Got Nothin (2003), an independent film. Parts of Analyze That (2002), which starred Diaz, were filmed in Hudson County, New Jersey. He said, "That was big for me, able to come home to film".

Diaz's profile increased with subsequent roles in Law & Order and his first major feature films, Spider-Man 2 (2004) and Taxi (2004). After, Diaz acted as an unlawful union organizer in The Longest Yard (2005). Diaz secured the role when he learned a remake of the original was in production, and had lunch with Chris Rock and Adam Sandler, during which Rock said he could land Diaz an audition. Diaz proceeded to assemble an audition tape: "I went out and got a football jersey two sizes too small, pants two sizes too small with my butt hanging out. I got kids' football shoulder pads and ran around the field with a cigar in my mouth". Three days after submitting the tape, Diaz landed the role; the producers liked the name Big Tony Tedesco, which Diaz named himself on the tape, and wrote it into the script. Originally the part had a mere three lines, but Diaz' tape got his part extended.

In 2005, Diaz expressed his wish to continue as a character actor, saying: "It's like a dream come true for me. ... I got my call and I have to make the most of it". Around this time, Diaz prepared his one-man comedy show Larceny & Laughter, which featured stories about his time growing up in North Bergen.

In 2007, Diaz appeared in four episodes of the television series My Name is Earl as Joey the Candy Bar Criminal. The show's producers wished to hire actors to play prisoners, and called Diaz after they saw him in The Longest Yard. That year, he hosted a series of humorous promotions for the Ultimate Fighting Championship as Joey Karate, giving karate instructions and comical predictions for upcoming fights. Diaz regards his role in the 2009 television film The Dog Who Saved Christmas as a point of pride, as it allowed children in North Bergen to see him act. At the time of filming, Diaz weighed 390 lbs. By late 2009, he slimmed down to 295 lbs.

In 2011 Diaz appeared in "Scarlet Ribbons", an episode of The Mentalist and the film Bucky Larson: Born to Be a Star.

Around 2011, Diaz raised $1400 from fans on Twitter and Facebook to finance a documentary about his upbringing in North Bergen, chronicling his life and how he was influenced by the various people who took care of him following his parents' death. Diaz contributed $2,600 to complete it and by mid-2012, Where I Got My Balls From was produced with his podcast co-host and producer Lee Syatt as director, who shot six hours of footage in total. Diaz made the film in tribute to those who helped him.

In 2013, Diaz appeared in "Sal's Pizza", the ninth episode of the comedy Brooklyn Nine-Nine. That same year, he played Robert De Niro's coach in the feature film Grudge Match, which premiered on December 25. Diaz took his fifth grade teacher to the premiere. In 2014, Diaz appeared in "White Truck", the twelfth episode of the second season of Maron. 

In 2017, Diaz started work on a presentation based on one of his cats for Animal Planet.

Podcasts
In 2009, Diaz was introduced to comedian Felicia Michaels, who encouraged him to co-host a new comedy podcast. Beauty and Da Beast launched in August 2010. In one early episode, Diaz recalled a story about setting a prostitute's wig on fire when he was young. The weekend after it aired, attendance increased at Diaz's stand-up shows. The podcast ended in November 2012 after 113 episodes.

On September 2, 2012, Diaz launched his own podcast The Church of What's Happening Now which he co-hosted with producer and sidekick Lee Syatt. Diaz named it after a phrase that his former manager told him while he was working selling cars in Boulder. Episodes were released on various audio-only podcast platforms in addition to the audio+video version on YouTube, where they garnered over half a million subscribers. 

On October 5, 2020, Diaz launched a new podcast series, Uncle Joey's Joint after moving back to New Jersey from California.  Diaz's former producer and sidekick Lee Syatt has been a recurring guest on the relaunched podcast but is no longer the show's producer.

Personal life
Diaz has married twice. In 1991, he divorced his first wife, during which he lost a relationship with their daughter. On November 25, 2009, he married Terrie Clark. The couple have one daughter.

In 2007, Diaz quit his longtime cocaine abuse. He later said, "It has to do with your peace of mind. For some people, it takes 10 years to acquire. It took me 30."

Filmography

Film
{| class="wikitable sortable"
|-
! Year
! Title
! Role
! class="unsortable" | Notes
|-
| 1998
| BASEketball 
| Referee
|-
|rowspan=6| 2002
| The History of Choking 
| Himself
| Documentary 
|-
| You Got Nothin'''  
| Charlie
|
|-
| American Gun| Gun Smuggler
|
|-
| Women vs. Men| Goon
| TV movie
|-
| Another Bobby O'Hara Story... 
| Tommy Brando
|
|-
| Analyze That| Ducks
|
|-
|rowspan=2| 2003
| The Mezzos 
| Joey Mezzo
| Short
|-
| Dickie Roberts: Former Child Star| Emmanuel's Entourage
|
|-
|rowspan=4| 2004
| Spider-Man 2  
| Train Passenger
|
|-
| Back by Midnight| Jojo 
|
|-
| Taxi| Freddy 
| 
|-
| The Mafia Type  
| Big Al
| Video short
|-
|rowspan=4| 2005
| Break a Leg   
| Large Producer
|
|-
| Accidentally on Purpose 
| Geraldo
| Short
|-
| The Longest Yard| Anthony "Big Tony" Cobianco
| 
|-
| Endings   
| 
| Video 
|-
|rowspan=4| 2006
| A Fine Line| Bruno Scalise
| Short
|-
| 18 Fingers of Death!| Sammy Delassandro
| Video
|-
| Joe Rogan: Live| Himself
| Video documentary
|-
| Road Dog| Himself
| Documentary
|-
|rowspan=3| 2007
| Smiley Face| Security Guard
| 
|-
| White Pants 
| Coach Larkin
| Short
|-
| A 'My Life at 26' Shortoon| Voice
| Video short
|-
|rowspan=3| 2008
| One Hogan Place| Vinnie Books
| TV Short
|-
| Boiler Maker 
| Enzo
| 
|-
| My Life at 26| Paxon
| TV movie
|-
|rowspan=3| 2009
| Redemption 
| Ritchie
| Short
|-
| The Deported 
| Sheriff
| 
|-
| The Dog Who Saved Christmas| Stewey McMann 
| TV movie
|-
|rowspan=4| 2010
| Stacy's Mom 
| Frankie the Teach 
| 
|-
| The Russian 
| Frank
| Short
|-
| Sinatra Club| Uncle Tony 
| 
|-
| The Dog Who Saved Christmas Vacation| Stewey McMann 
| TV movie
|-
|rowspan=5| 2011
| Stonerville 
| Johnny Scarano
| Video
|-
| Bucky Larson: Born to Be a Star| German Guy / Distributor 
| 
|-
| The Dog Who Saved Halloween| Stewey McMann 
| TV movie 
|-
| My Dog's Christmas Miracle| TSA Officer
| Video
|-
| Outtakes| Joey 
| Short
|-
|rowspan=6| 2012
| Leader of the Pack 
| Cicero
| Short
|-
| Jersey Shore Shark Attack 
| Richie 
| TV movie
|-
| The Dog Who Saved the Holidays| Stewey McMann 
| TV movie
|-
| On Set: Jersey Shore Shark Attack| Himself
| Short
|-
| Joe Rogan Live from the Tabernacle 
| Himself
| Video
|-
| Where I Got My Balls From 
| Himself
| Documentary
|-
| 2013
| Grudge Match 
| Mikey 
| 
|-
| 2014
| The Dog Who Saved Easter| Stewey McMann 
| TV movie
|-
| 2015
| The Dog Who Saved Summer| Stewey McMann 
| TV movie
|-
|rowspan=2| 2016
| The Bronx Bull| Mickey
| 
|-
| Rules Don't Apply| Mobster
| 
|-
| 2020
| Grapefruit| Fairy Godfather (voice) 
| Short
|-
| 2021
| The Many Saints of Newark 
|Buddha
| 
|}

Television
{| class="wikitable sortable"
|-
! Year
! Title
! Role
! class="unsortable" | Notes
|-
| 2000
| ComicView 
| Himself
| Episode: "ComicView: New Orleans Party Gras"
|-
|rowspan=2| 2001
| 18 Wheels of Justice 
| 
| Episode: "Just South of El Paso"
|-
| Mad TV  
| Salvatore 'Big Pussy' Bonpensiero
| Episode: "Episode #6.24"
|-
| 2002
| NYPD Blue| Manny Mankiewicz
| Episode: "Death by Cycle"
|-
|rowspan=2| 2003
| Karen Sisco 
| Paulie
| Episode: "Dear Derwood..."
|-
| ER 
| Grocery Store Clerk
| Episode: "The Greater Good"
|-
|rowspan=4| 2004
| Cold Case 
| Ken Mazzacone 
| Episode: "Disco Inferno"
|-
| Law & Order: Special Victims Unit 
| Elijah Coney
| Episode: "Criminal"
|-
| Inside Joke 
| Himself
| TV series
|-
| National Lampoon Live: New Faces - Down and Dirty 
| Himself
| TV Special
|-
|rowspan=2| 2006
| How I Met Your Mother 
| Angry New Yorker
| Episode: "Where Were We?"
|-
| Everybody Hates Chris 
| Store Owner
| Episode: "Everybody Hates Promises"
|-
|rowspan=6| 2007
| Murder 101 
| Herbie Saxe
| Episode: "College Can Be Murder"
|-
| My Name Is Earl 
| Joey the Prisoner 
| Recurring Cast: Season 3
|-
| Frank TV 
| Defendant
| Episode: "Ballpark Frank"
|-
| Jimmy Shubert: Alive N' Kickin 
| Himself 
| TV Special
|-
| 1st Amendment Stand Up  
| Himself 
| Episode: "Joey Diaz/Melanie Comarcho/Lavell Crawford"
|-
| The Payaso Comedy Slam   
| Himself 
| TV Special documentary
|-
|rowspan=3| 2008
| Wizards of Waverly Place 
| Newstand Guy
| Episode: "The Supernatural"
|-
| Inside MMA  
| Himself  
| Episode: "Episode #2.17"
|-
| XXXtreme Comedy Tour  
| Himself 
| TV Special
|-
| 2010
| Your Mom's House 
| Himself 
| TV series
|-
|rowspan=3| 2011
| Supah Ninjas 
| Mr. Binzodo
| Episode: "Kickbutt"
|-
| The Mentalist 
| Gangster
| Episode: "Scarlet Ribbons"
|-
| Gabriel Iglesias Presents Stand-Up Revolution 
| Himself 
| Episode: "Rick Gutierrez/Thea Vidale/Joey CoCo Diaz"
|-
|rowspan=2| 2012
| Kickin' It 
| Meatball King 
| Episode: "We Are Family"
|-
| Childrens Hospital 
| Vito
| Episode: "Wisedocs"
|-
|rowspan=2| 2013
| Partners 
| Bob
| Episode: "Two Nines and a Pair of Queens"
|-
| Brooklyn Nine-Nine 
| Sal 
| Episode: "Sal's Pizza"
|-
| 2014
| TripTank 
| Cat Man (voice) 
| Episode: "Game Over" & "Ahhh, Serenity"
|-
| 2014-16
| Maron 
| Bobby Mendez
| Episode: "The Joke" & "Philippe"
|-
| 2017
| Superior Donuts 
| Jake
| Episode: "Secrets and Spies"
|-
|rowspan=2| 2018
| I'm Dying Up Here 
| Taffy
| Episode: "Gone with the Wind" & "The Mattresses"
|-
| The Guest Book 
| Vinnie
| Episode: "Finding Reality" & "Killer Party"
|-
|rowspan=2| 2020
| The Midnight Gospel  
| Various 
| Main Cast 
|-
| Big City Greens 
| John (voice)
| Episode: "Friend Con/Flimflammed"
|}

Video games

Comedy releasesLive at the 3 Clubs in Hollywood (2011)It's Either You or the Priest (2012)Testicle Testaments 1: The Worst & Best Day of My Life (2012)Testicle Testaments 2: Crime Stories (2012)Testicle Testaments 3: The Person Who Made Me a Man (2012)The Blue Album (2013)Testicle Testaments 4: How I Got Into Comedy (2013)Testicle Testaments 5: Crimes Against Myself (2023)You Can't Eat Pussy with Asthma (2013)Savage Dad (2015)Socially Unacceptable (2016)The Degenerates'' (2018)

References

External links

 
 

1963 births
Living people
20th-century American comedians
21st-century American male actors
21st-century American comedians
American male film actors
American male comedians
American people of Spanish descent
American podcasters
American stand-up comedians
Comedians from New Jersey
Cuban comedians
Cuban emigrants to the United States
Cuban male comedians
North Bergen High School alumni
University of Colorado Boulder alumni
Patreon creators
People from Havana
People from North Bergen, New Jersey